Synphilin-1 is a protein that in humans is encoded by the SNCAIP gene. SNCAIP stands for "synuclein, alpha interacting protein" and can be signified by SNCAP_HUMAN, synphilin 1, synuclein, alpha interacting protein (synphilin), and SYPH1.

Function 

This gene encodes a protein containing several protein-protein interaction domains, including ankyrin-like repeats, a coiled-coil domain, and an ATP/GTP-binding motif. The encoded protein interacts with alpha-synuclein in neuronal tissue and may play a role in the formation of cytoplasmic inclusions and neurodegeneration. A mutation in this gene has been associated with Parkinson's disease. Alternatively spliced transcript variants encoding different isoforms of this gene have been described, but their full-length nature has yet to be determined.

The SNCAIP gene provides instructions for making a protein called synphilin-1 and a slightly different version of this protein called synphilin-1A. These proteins are produced in the brain. They are usually located in specialized structures called presynaptic terminals, found at the tips of nerve cells. In nerve cells, synphilin-1 and synphilin-1A interact with another protein called alpha-synuclein. The functions of synphilin-1 and synphilin-1A, however, are unknown.

Interactions 

SNCAIP has been shown to interact with:
 Alpha-synuclein  and
 Parkin (ligase).

References

Further reading